Kringa is a village near Tinjan, Istria, Croatia. In the 2011 census, the population of Kringa was 315.

Kringa is home to the vampire legend of Jure Grando.

References

Populated places in Istria County